Isla de La Juventud  is a Cuban football team playing in the Cuban National Football League and representing Isla de la Juventud Municipality. They play their home games at El Rodeo in Nueva Gerona.

Current squad
2018 Season

References

External links
http://el.soccerway.com/teams/cuba/isla-de-la-juventud/9899/

Football clubs in Cuba
Isla de la Juventud
Nueva Gerona